"Father and Daughter" is a song by the American singer-songwriter Paul Simon. The song, written for the animated family film The Wild Thornberrys Movie, was released as a single in 2002. An alternate version later appeared on Simon's eleventh solo album Surprise (2006). When re-released as a single in 2006, the song became a Top 40 hit in the UK, his most recent to date.

The song is a ballad in which Simon expresses his love for his daughter, Lulu.

The song was nominated for an Academy Award for Best Original Song, as well as the Golden Globe Award for Best Original Song.

Background
The song expresses the singer's hopes and dreams for his daughter. Simon wrote the song as an ode to his daughter, Lulu, who was seven at the time it was completed. Simon's son, Adrian, sings harmony on the song's choruses; he was 10 years old at the time of recording. He had heard his son singing along to it while driving and encouraged him to contribute to it.

It was written for the animated family film The Wild Thornberrys Movie and released in 2002. The song also appeared on the movie soundtrack album, and a different mix of the same performance was used for Simon's 2006 release, Surprise,  and the 2007 compilation, The Essential Paul Simon.

The music video for the song was directed by Wayne Isham, and features Simon performing the song in a child's bedroom, intercut with clips from The Wild Thornberrys Movie, as well as live action clips of wild animals (which were used in the end credits of the film).

Reception
The song received a favorable response from critics. Scott Mervis, writing for the Pittsburgh Post-Gazette, considered it "the best pop song he's written in years," while Claudia Puig of USA Today dubbed it "classic Simon." Heather Phares of AllMusic felt it "mellow [and] amiable."

Track listing
"Father and Daughter"
"Father and Daughter" (Instrumental)
"Father and Daughter" (Video)

Personnel
Paul Simon – vocals, electric guitar, nylon-string acoustic guitar, high-string acoustic guitar
Vincent Nguini – acoustic guitar
Steve Gadd – drums
Abe Laboriel – bass
Adrian Simon – vocals

Charts

References

2002 singles
2002 songs
Paul Simon songs
Songs written by Paul Simon
Song recordings produced by Brian Eno
Song recordings produced by Paul Simon
Music videos directed by Wayne Isham
The Wild Thornberrys
Songs written for films
2000s ballads
Songs about fathers
Songs written for animated films
Jive Records singles
Warner Records singles